T14 tank may refer to:

 T-14 Armata, a Russian main battle tank to enter service in 2019 or later
 T14 Heavy Tank, a joint American and British project to develop a heavy tank cancelled in 1944